The Barcelona School of Economics (BSE) is an institution for research and graduate education in economics, finance, data science, and the social sciences located in Barcelona, Spain.

The school's academic offer includes Master's degrees as well as summer schools, professional courses, and in-company training.

BSE research has been ranked among the top Economics Departments in the world.

The school is accredited by the Catalan University Quality Assurance Agency (AQU).

History

Established as the Barcelona Graduate School of Economics (Barcelona GSE), the institution was legally recognized by the Government of Catalonia in October 2006 as a foundation dedicated to higher education.

The School was created with the objective to foster scientific cooperation between four existing academic and research units in Barcelona:

Universitat Pompeu Fabra— Department of Economics and Business
 Universitat Autònoma de Barcelona — Unit of Economic Analysis
 Institute for Economic Analysis
 Centre for Research in International Economics

The School's board of trustees includes both private and public institutions.

The school changed its name to Barcelona School of Economics in 2021.

Scientific Council

The BSE Scientific Council works with faculty and administrators to ensure the quality of teaching, research, and admissions procedures. The council is made up of leading academics, including several Nobel Laureates in Economics.

The first chair of the Scientific Council was Hugo Sonnenschein (1940-2021), President Emeritus of the University of Chicago, who held the position from 2008 until 2021.

Members of the Barcelona School of Economics Scientific Council

 Daron Acemoglu, MIT
 Aloisio Araujo, IMPA and Fundação Getulio Vargas (Rio de Janeiro)
 Orley Ashenfelter, Princeton University
 Chong-En Bai, Tsinghua University
 Richard Blundell, University College London
 Janet Currie, Princeton University
 Partha Dasgupta, University of Cambridge
 Mathias Dewatripont Université Libre de Bruxelles
 Darrell Duffie, Stanford Graduate School of Business
Raquel Fernández, New York University
 Oliver Hart, Harvard University, Nobel Laureate
 James J. Heckman, University of Chicago, Nobel Laureate
 Bengt Holmström, MIT, Nobel Laureate
 Matthew O. Jackson, Stanford University
 Timothy Kehoe, University of Minnesota
 Anne Krueger, The Johns Hopkins University
 Justin Yifu Lin, Peking University
 Robert Lucas, University of Chicago, Nobel Laureate
 Charles F. Manski, Northwestern University
 Eric S. Maskin, Harvard University Nobel Laureate
 Preston McAfee, former Chief Economist of Microsoft
 Roger Myerson, University of Chicago Nobel Laureate
 Juan Pablo Nicolini, United States Federal Reserve Bank of Minneapolis
 Edward C. Prescott, University of Arizona, Nobel Laureate
 Hélène Rey, London Business School
 John Roberts, Stanford University
 Alvin Roth, Stanford University, Nobel Laureate
 Ariel Rubinstein, Tel Aviv University and New York University
 Thomas J. Sargent, New York University, Nobel Laureate
 Christopher A. Sims, Yale University, Nobel Laureate
 Robert M. Solow, MIT, Nobel Laureate
 Nancy Stokey, University of Chicago
 Fabrizio Zilibotti, University of Zürich

Research
One of BSE's main objectives is to make Barcelona a leading community in economics research worldwide.

Research rankings
The Barcelona School of Economics research community constitutes one of the leading clusters of economics research in Europe. It has been ranked by RePEc among the top 15 Economics Departments in the world, the top 5 in Europe, and as the best in Spain.

Severo Ochoa Research Excellence accreditations
In 2011, BSE was distinguished as one of only eight Centers of Research Excellence with an international impact in the framework of the Severo Ochoa Research Excellence Program, which promotes frontier research and distinguish those institutions that are defining the global scientific debate.

In 2016, it became the only center focused on economics and the social sciences to receive a second Severo Ochoa distinction.

BSE received a third consecutive Severo Ochoa distinction for the period 2020–23.

Research areas
 Behavioral and Experimental Economics
 Business Economics
Data Science
 Development Economics
 Economic History
 Financial Economics
 Game Theory
 Growth and Development
 Health Economics
 Industrial Organization
 International Economics
 Labor Economics
 Macroeconomics
 Microeconomics
 Monetary and Fiscal Policy
 Political Economy
 Public Economics
 Social Choice and Mechanism Design
 Statistics, Econometrics and Quantitative Methods

Research activities
The main research activities organized by the Barcelona School of Economics include:

 BSE Lectures
 Research Recognition Program
 Calvó-Armengol International Prize
 BSE "Trobada" (annual academic gathering)
 BSE Summer Forum

Faculty

Affiliated professors

Affiliated Professors of the Barcelona School of Economics are tenured or tenure-track faculty members from the BSE academic units.

Among the affiliated professors there are Fellows of the Econometric Society, Fellows of the European Economic Association, Research Fellows of the Centre for Economic Policy and Research (CEPR), and Research Fellows of CESifo. They publish in the leading journals of Economics and many of the journals of the different subfields of the discipline. They also serve as coeditors and associate editors of these journals.

At present there are some 150 affiliated professors, including:

 José Apesteguia
 Jordi Brandts
 Fernando Broner
 Julian di Giovanni
Jan Eeckhout
 Jordi Galí
 José G. Montalvo
 Nezih Guner
 Flip Klijn
 Gábor Lugosi
 Inés Macho-Stadler
 Albert Marcet
 Alberto Martín
 Massimo Motta
 Rosemarie Nagel
 David Pérez-Castrillo
 José-Luis Peydró
 Marta Reynal-Querol
 Barbara Rossi
 Albert Satorra
 Jaume Ventura

Guest professors

Some of the scholars and professionals who have taught at the Barcelona School of Economics as guest professors are:

 Simon Johnson
 Timothy Kehoe
 Xavier Sala-i-Martin
 Reinhilde Veugelers

Academic programs
The academic programs of the Barcelona School of Economics attract a highly international group of students in several main programs.

Master's degrees

The Barcelona School of Economics offers master's programs leading to three different master's degrees:

Master's Degree in Economics and Finance
 Economics 
 Finance
 PhD Track Program

Master's Degree in Specialized Economic Analysis
 Competition and Market Regulation
 Economics of Public Policy
 International Trade, Finance, and Development
 Macroeconomic Policy and Financial Markets

Master's Degree in Data Science
 Data Science for Decision Making
Data Science Methodology

PhD programs
There are two PhD programs in the Barcelona School of Economics community, one at the Universitat Autònoma de Barcelona (UAB) and one at the Universitat Pompeu Fabra (UPF). Both programs are organized jointly with BSE:

 International Doctorate in Economic Analysis (IDEA).
 Graduate Program in Economics, Finance and Management (GPEFM).

Other academic programs

BSE offers summer school programs, professional courses, and in-company training throughout the year.

Campuses

The Barcelona School of Economics has two campuses: Ciutadella campus (UPF) and  Bellaterra campus (UAB).

Alumni ambassadors 
The Barcelona School of Economics counts on an international network of alumni ambassadors, selected from renowned past students.

Barcelona Chapter

 Daniele Alimonti
 Ilaria Vigo
 Thomas Woiczyk

Berlin Chapter

 Andreas Michalovcik
 Mario Schäfer

Brussels Chapter

 Nuno Almeida

Lima Chapter

 Gabriela Lopez

London Chapter

 Swasti Gupta
 Angelo Martelli

Madrid Chapter

 Isaac Ré Delgado

New York Chapter

 Luis Mateo

Paris Chapter

 Thang Nguyen

References

External links
Barcelona School of Economics website
Universitat Pompeu Fabra - Economics and Business Department.
Universitat Autònoma de Barcelona - Unit of Economic Analysis
Institute for Economic Analysis (CSIC)
Center for Research in International Economics (CREI)

Universities in Catalonia
Economics schools
Economic research institutes
Research institutes in Catalonia